Ronald F. Johnson (July 20, 1938 – February 1, 2015) was an American National Basketball Association (NBA) player. Johnson played at New Prague (Minn.) High School where he became Minnesota's first boys’ high school basketball player to score 2,000 career points (2,190) when he graduated in 1956.

As a junior at the University of Minnesota, Johnson was selected to the AP All-American third team. In his senior season, Ron was selected to the NABC All-American third team. He played in the east–west college all-star game at New York City's Madison Square Garden in 1960. Johnson finished his collegiate career with 1,335 points (19.7 points per game average).

Johnson was drafted by the Detroit Pistons with the fourth pick in the second round of the 1960 NBA Draft. On December 15, 1960, he was sold from the Pistons to the Los Angeles Lakers. In his one NBA season, Ron averaged 2.6 points and 2.1 rebounds per game.

Johnson, who was an attorney in St. Cloud, Minnesota, died of an aneurysm on February 1, 2015. He was 76.

References

1938 births
2015 deaths
20th-century American lawyers
All-American college men's basketball players
American men's basketball players
Basketball players from Minnesota
Deaths from aneurysm
Detroit Pistons draft picks
Detroit Pistons players
Forwards (basketball)
Los Angeles Lakers players
Minnesota Golden Gophers men's basketball players
Minnesota lawyers
People from Hallock, Minnesota